Pierre Rodocanachi (born 2 October 1938) is a French fencer. He won a bronze medal in the team foil event at the 1964 Summer Olympics.

References

External links
 

1938 births
Living people
French male foil fencers
Olympic fencers of France
Fencers at the 1964 Summer Olympics
Olympic bronze medalists for France
Olympic medalists in fencing
Fencers from Paris
French people of Greek descent
Medalists at the 1964 Summer Olympics